St Vincent's C.B.S. is an independent Catholic Voluntary Secondary School in Glasnevin, Dublin, Ireland. It operates as a registered charity under the trusteeship of the Edmund Rice Schools Trust. As of 2017, St Vincent's CBS secondary school had an enrollment of 375 boys.

History
The school was founded in 1856, when the Society of St Vincent de Paul purchased a building in Mountbrown, Kilmainham.
Within a year, this building proved to be too small and land was purchased at the junction of Finglas Road and Botanic Road in Glasnevin. A building was erected on the site of what later became the Dalcassian Downs residential development. This school opened in 1860 and had residential accommodation for 150 boy boarders, teaching facilities, and a farm which supplied milk and vegetables.

Initially run by the Congregation of the Holy Ghost (Spiritans), in 1863 the Congregation of Christian Brothers took over. Day boys were enrolled from January 1927, and a new primary school building was opened in 1939.

At the centenary in 1956, there were still 140 boarders and the farm was still in operation.

The secondary school continued to operate in the old building until new buildings were opened in 1964. Boarding continued until 1973 when the school became entirely a day school. A swimming pool was built in 1968 and a sports hall in 1976. (The pool closed in late 2009, due to "lack of funds needed for repairs").

The main school frontage is now on Finglas Road in Glasnevin, Dublin 11, opposite Glasnevin cemetery. Behind the secondary school, and between it and the playing fields, is St Vincent's primary school.

The former principal of St. Vincent's secondary school, John Horan, served as president of the GAA from 2018 to 2021.

Facilities
The school was recently refurbished, including with new equipment for its chemistry, physics and computer laboratories, and the extension of the Arts & Crafts, Construction Technology and Library multimedia facilities was completed in 2017.

The school has over 10 acres of sports fields. A large sports hall/gymnasium complex contains a gaelic handball alley, a basketball court where large-scale competitions are held, and other facilities such as specialist classrooms, a canteen and an oratory.

Achievements
A student from the school (Walter Hayes) won the Young Scientist Exhibition in 1967 and the school won the Young Social Innovators Award in 2006.

In terms of sport, the school is known for:
 Basketball; a long-established club: from academy level ("Little Saints") to Superleague (since 1990: 3 Superleague titles (including 2005–06, runners-up in 2011–12), 3 Superleague Northern Conference titles (including 2011–12), 2 National Cup titles, 8 National Championship titles, and 2 National League Division 1 titles), sharing a history with, and feeding into, the DCU Saints men's professional team. 
 Swimming; particularly life-saving and water polo. The Water-Polo Club is one of the largest in Ireland. In the 2013/14 season, the Water-Polo Club were the Irish National League Champions for both Ladies and Men, as well as Ladies' Irish Cup & Men's National Knockout Cup holders. At underage level, the Girls and Boys were winners of their respective Irish U/19 Cups.

The school also has athletics, rugby, soccer, hurling, gaelic football and boxing squads.

Alumni

Arts and media
Patrick Collins - Painter
Ronan Collins - RTÉ broadcaster
Patrick Cosgrave - Journalist and writer
Jack Cruise - Theatre actor and comedian
Vincent Doyle - Journalist and newspaper editor
Aidan Gillen - Stage and screen actor
Pat Liddy - Artist, historian, author and lobbyist
Alan Moore - Sports journalist and administrator
Frank McDonald - Environment editor of The Irish Times
Simon Young - RTÉ presenter

Politics and administration
Frank Cluskey - Labour Party leader, Minister for Trade, Commerce and Tourism
Fr John Fogarty - Superior General, Congregation of the Holy Spirit
Declan Kelly - Ambassador
John O'Connell - Politician (TD, Ceann Comhairle, Senator and MEP)
Francis Martin O'Donnell - Senior UN official and ambassador
Jim Tunney - Politician and Gaelic footballer

Sport
Paul Caffrey - Gaelic footballer
Eamonn Coghlan - Olympian, senator and world champion athlete
Kenny Cunningham - Republic of Ireland international soccer player
Dessie Farrell - Dublin Gaelic football men's senior manager
John Furlong - CEO of the 2010 Vancouver Olympic Organizing Committee
Dessie Glynn - Republic of Ireland international soccer
Pat Hickey - Olympic Council of Ireland, International Olympic Committee
John Horan - President of GAA
Con Martin - Soccer and Gaelic footballer
Mick Martin - Soccer player
Jason Sherlock - Gaelic footballer
Harry Thuillier - Olympic fencer and broadcaster

References

External links

St Vincent's C.B.S. Primary School

Educational institutions established in 1856
Congregation of Christian Brothers secondary schools in the Republic of Ireland
Glasnevin
Secondary schools in Dublin (city)
1856 establishments in Ireland